Elm-Asse is a Samtgemeinde ("collective municipality") in the district of Wolfenbüttel, in Lower Saxony, Germany. It was named after the hill ranges Elm and Asse. Its seat is in the town Schöppenstedt. It was formed on 1 January 2015 by the merger of the former Samtgemeinden Asse and Schöppenstedt.

The Samtgemeinde Elm-Asse consists of the following municipalities:

 Dahlum
 Denkte
 Hedeper
 Kissenbrück
 Kneitlingen
 Remlingen-Semmenstedt
 Roklum
 Schöppenstedt
 Uehrde
 Vahlberg
 Winnigstedt
 Wittmar

Samtgemeinden in Lower Saxony